Cavendish Road is an arterial road in Brisbane, Queensland, Australia, linking the suburbs of Coorparoo, Holland Park and Mount Gravatt East.

Geography
Cavendish Road commences at Coorparoo Secondary College near Bridgewater Creek in Coorparoo and then runs in an approximately south-eastly direction over hilly terrain. It terminates at the intersection with Creek Road in Mount Gravatt East. Although the road appears to continue beyond that point, it becomes Newnham Road.

History

The road first appears in a survey of Coorparoo in July 1863.

A number of the early residents were keen whist players and the book commonly known as Cavendish on Whist was considered the authority on the game. Cavendish was the pen name of English writer and whist player Henry Jones, who was a member of the Cavendish Whist Club. This is said to be the origin of the road name.

Cavendish Road State High School was constructed at 695 Cavendish Road in Holland Park. It opened on 9 April 1951.

Landmarks
Significant landmarks on Cavendish Road include:
 No 208: the heritage-listed Coorparoo School of Arts and RSL Memorial Hall
 No 219: the heritage-listed former Coorparoo Fire Station

Major intersections
The entire road is in the Brisbane local government area.

References

Roads in Brisbane
Coorparoo, Queensland
Holland Park, Queensland